Jane Margaret Fearnley-Whittingstall (née Lascelles) (born 1939 in Kensington, London) is a writer and garden designer with a diploma in landscape architecture. She won two gold medals at the Chelsea Flower Show.

Personal life
Daughter of Colonel John Hawdon Lascelles OBE of the King's Royal Rifle Corps and Janet Hamilton Campbell Kidston,  she and her husband, Robert Fearnley-Whittingstall, of a landed gentry family formerly of Watford and Hawkswick, Hertfordshire, have two children: Sophy and Hugh, the celebrity chef. They have six grandchildren.

Career
She gained a Diploma in Landscape Architecture from Gloucestershire College of Art and Design in 1980 and has designed numerous gardens in the UK and abroad.

From 2005 to 2007 she wrote a weekly column about family life, in The Times. She has also written for The Daily Telegraph, Daily Mail,  The Oldie, Woman's Weekly, The Garden, The English Garden and Gardens Illustrated.

Books
 Rose Gardens: Their History and Design (Chatto and Windus 1989)
Historic Gardens: A Guide to 160 British Gardens of Interest (Webb and Bower 1990)
Ivies (Chatto and Windus 1992)
 Gardening Made Easy: A Step-By-Step Guide to Planning, Preparing, Planting, Maintaining and Enjoying Your Garden (Weidenfeld and Nicolson 1995)
Garden Plants Made Easy (Weidenfeld & Nicolson 1997)
Peonies - the Imperial Flower (Weidenfeld & Nicolson 1999)
The Garden: an English Love Affair (Weidenfeld & Nicolson 2002)
 The Good Granny Guide: Or How to Be a Modern Grandmother (Short Books Ltd 2005) (illustrated by Alex Fox)
The Good Granny Diary (Short Books Ltd 2006) (illustrated by Alex Fox)
The Good Granny Cookbook (Short Books Ltd 2007)
The Good Granny Companion (Short Books Ltd 2008)
For Better for Worse - a light-hearted guide to wedded bliss (Short Books 2010), also published as 'Happily Ever After' (Marble Arch Press New York 2013)
The Ministry of Food - Thrifty wartime ways to feed your family today (Hodder & Stoughton 2010)
The Pocket Book of Good Grannies (Short Books 2011)
Source:

References

External links

English garden writers
English gardeners
1939 births
Living people